Neil S. Calman is a family physician and the president, CEO, and co-founder of the Institute for Family Health. He is the Chairman of the Department of Family Medicine & Community Health at the Icahn School of Medicine at Mount Sinai and the Board Chair of the Community Health Care Association of New York State.

Biography
Calman was born in New York. He graduated from University of Chicago in 1971 and from the University of Medicine and Dentistry of New Jersey at Rutgers University with a MMS in 1973 and from Rush University with a MD in 1975. Calman spent two months pre-residency volunteering at a clinic in Delano, California  with the United Farm Workers Union. He completed residency at Montefiore Medical Center with the Montefiore Residency Program in Social Medicine in the Bronx, NY.  Calman was inspired by his grandfather, an attorney, oral surgeon, and socialist alderman in New York City, who fought for a number of social justice issues.

Calman co-founded the Institute for Family Health, a FQHC in 1983  where he has served since its inception as the President and CEO. 
In 2012 with Mount Sinai Hospital, Calman co-founded the Department of Family Medicine and Community Health at the Icahn School of Medicine at Mount Sinai, the first department of family medicine in Manhattan, where he serves as a professor and chair of the department.  
Calman is the President of the American Association of Teaching Health Centers and the Board Chair of the Community Health Care Association of New York State. 
Calman was elected to the National Academy of Medicine and the New York Academy of Medicine

Family Medicine
Calman was trained in family medicine and has been recognized as New York Metro Area's Top Doctor from 2002-2014. He has been profiled in books on family medicine physicians.
Calman started three family medicine residency programs at the Institute for Family Health; two in New York City and one in the mid-Hudson Valley.

Health Disparities
Calman is committed to eliminating structural racism and examining the ways health care remains segregated. He is the Principal Investigator for Bronx Health REACH, a Centers for Disease Control and Prevention-funded community coalition addressing racial and ethnic disparities in health outcomes, since their formation in 1999. His article  “Out of the Shadows”  discusses his experience in dealing with racism in the care of his patients.
Calman was appointed to the HIT Policy Committee serving on the Meaningful Use Subcommittee by the Obama administration responsible for establishing recommendations for the deployment of Health IT in practices and hospitals nationwide.
Calman is sourced in media including The New York Times and television news networks to discuss health care delivery and health disparities.

Appointments
 Board of Health Care Services, National Academy of Medicine 
 Board Chair, Community Health Care Association of New York State 
 2009-2014 HIT Policy Committee, Office of the National Coordinator of Health Information Technology, Health and Human Services  
 1993-2014  New York State Council on Graduate Medical Education

Awards and honors

Publications

Research
Partial list:

Published Essays
 “Lost to Follow-Up” – The Public Health Goals of Accountable Care. Calman NS, Hauser D, Chokshi, DA. Archives of Internal Medicine. 2012 Apr 9;172(7):584-6  
 Making Health Equality a Reality: The Bronx Takes Action. Calman NS. Health Affairs. 2005 March/April; 24(2):491-498.  
 So Tired of Life. Calman NS. Health Affairs. 2004 May/June; 23:228-232. 
 No One Needs to Know. Calman NS. Health Affairs. 2001 March/April; 20(2):243.  
Out of the Shadow. Calman NS. Health Affairs. Jan/Feb 2000; 19(1):170.

References 

Living people
Icahn School of Medicine at Mount Sinai faculty
Physicians from New York City
Year of birth missing (living people)
Members of the National Academy of Medicine